The Bellarmine Knights women's basketball team represents Bellarmine University, located in Louisville, Kentucky, in NCAA Division I as a member of the ASUN Conference.

The Knights were members of the Division II Great Lakes Valley Conference from 1982 to 2020 before the move to Division I during the 2020–21 season.

The team plays its games at Freedom Hall in Louisville.

Postseason

NCAA Division II tournament results
The Knights made fifteen appearances in the NCAA Division II women's basketball tournament. They had a combined record of 11–16.

References

External links